Charles Terence "Terry" Tobacco (born 2 March 1936) was a Canadian Olympic athlete.

Biography
Originally from the village of Cumberland on Vancouver Island, Tobacco first got noticed at the age of 15 when he won both the 100 and 220 yard races at the Island high school championships.

Taken under the tutelage of Victoria "Flying Y" coach Bruce Humber he was just 17 when made the national team for the 1954 British Empire and Commonwealth Games, held locally in Vancouver. During the games he won two medals, a bronze in the 440 yard race and a silver in the 4x440 yard relay, in which he ran the anchor leg. For these performances he was honoured with British Columbia's "Top Male Athlete" of the year award in 1954.

Tobacco was a member of the Canadian team at the 1956 Summer Olympics in Melbourne. In the 400 metres individual race he won his heat, before being eliminated in the quarter-final stage, but participated in the final of the 400 metres relay. The Canadians finished fifth, behind the United States, Australia, Great Britain and Germany. He ran his semi-final leg in 45.3 seconds.

At the 1958 British Empire and Commonwealth Games in Cardiff he was a bronze medallist again in the men's 440 yards race. He was a member of the relay team that finished fourth in the 4x440.

He also represented Canada at the 1960 Summer Olympics in Rome. Once again he made it through to the second round and he was also part of both the 4x100 and 4x400 relay teams which were semi-finalists.

An NCAA athlete for the University of Washington, Tobacco was a two-time Pacific Coast Conference champion in the 440.

He was inducted into the Greater Victoria Sports Hall of Fame in 2007.

References

External links
Terry Tobacco at Sports Reference

1936 births
Living people
Athletes (track and field) at the 1954 British Empire and Commonwealth Games
Athletes (track and field) at the 1958 British Empire and Commonwealth Games
Commonwealth Games silver medallists for Canada
Commonwealth Games bronze medallists for Canada
Commonwealth Games medallists in athletics
Athletes (track and field) at the 1956 Summer Olympics
Athletes (track and field) at the 1960 Summer Olympics
Olympic track and field athletes of Canada
Canadian male sprinters
Washington Huskies men's track and field athletes
Sportspeople from British Columbia
People from the Comox Valley Regional District
Medallists at the 1954 British Empire and Commonwealth Games
Medallists at the 1958 British Empire and Commonwealth Games